Demosthenesia is a genus of flowering plants belonging to the family Ericaceae.

Its native range is Peru to Bolivia and Brazil.

The genus name of Demosthenesia is in honour of Demosthenes (384–322 BC), a Greek politician.

Species known:

Demosthenesia amicorum 
Demosthenesia buxifolia 
Demosthenesia cordifolia 
Demosthenesia dudleyi 
Demosthenesia fabulosa 
Demosthenesia mandonii 
Demosthenesia matsiguenka 
Demosthenesia microphylla 
Demosthenesia oppositifolia 
Demosthenesia pearcei 
Demosthenesia spectabilis 
Demosthenesia vilcabambensis 
Demosthenesia weberbaueri

References

Ericaceae
Ericaceae genera